The McLaren M18 is an open-wheel Formula 5000 racing car designed and made by McLaren in 1971.

Development
The car was conceived to participate in the 1971 Formula 5000 season to replace the M10.

Design
The car was powered by a 470-hp Chevrolet V8, which drove the rear wheels through a five-speed manual gearbox.

Racing history
The car, entrusted to the driver Brian Redman, did not have the hoped-for success and only managed to win two of the 16 championship races.

References

External links

McLaren racing cars
Formula 5000 cars